The 2021–22 season was the 55th season in the existence of PEC Zwolle and the club's 24th consecutive season in the top flight of Dutch football. In addition to the domestic league, PEC Zwolle participated in this season's editions of the KNVB Cup.

On 11 May, PEC Zwolle descended to the second division for the first time since the 2011–12 season.

Players

First-team squad

Transfers

In

Out

Pre-season and friendlies

Competitions

Overall record

Eredivisie

League table

Results summary

Results by round

Matches
The league fixtures were announced on 11 June 2021.

KNVB Cup

References

PEC Zwolle seasons
PEC Zwolle